Rodora is a 1956 movie from Sampaguita Pictures about a man (Juancho Gutierrez) who falls in love with a girl (Amalia Fuentes).

External links

1956 films
Tagalog-language films
1956 comedy-drama films
Sampaguita Pictures films
1956 comedy films
1956 drama films
Philippine comedy-drama films
Philippine black-and-white films